Pukyongosaurus (meaning "Pukyong lizard", after the Pukyong National University) is a genus of titanosauriform dinosaur that lived in South Korea during the Early Cretaceous period (Aptian - Albian). It may have been closely related to Euhelopus, and is known from a series of vertebrae in the neck and back. The characteristics that were originally used to distinguish this genus have been criticized as being either widespread or too poorly preserved to evaluate, rendering the genus an indeterminate nomen dubium among titanosauriforms. The 2022 study noted that Pukyongosaurus is probably a somphospondylan.

Discovery
In 2001, several fragments of a sauropod skeleton were discovered in the Hasandong Formation in Hadong County, South Korea.  One of the caudal vertebrae ascribed to Pukyongosaurus has bite marks from theropod teeth.

References 

Macronarians
Early Cretaceous dinosaurs of Asia
Barremian life
Hauterivian life
Fossils of South Korea
Fossil taxa described in 2001
Taxa named by Dong Zhiming
Nomina dubia